Steven Dietz (born June 23, 1958) is an American playwright, theatre director, and teacher.  Called "the most ubiquitous American playwright whose name you may never have heard", Dietz has long been one of America's most prolific and widely produced playwrights.  In 2019, Dietz was again named one of the 20 most-produced playwrights in America.

Though several of his plays have been seen Off-Broadway (including "Fiction", "Lonely Planet", "God's Country"), the vast majority of Dietz's plays are produced in American regional theaters. Seattle WA and Chicago IL are among the cities that have proved to be enduring homes for his work. Seattle's ACT Theatre has produced 12 plays by Dietz, including 7 world premieres.  This includes a recent new variation on his own adaptation of "Dracula" (the most widely produced adaptation of that title in the U.S.) entitled "Dracula: Mina's Quest". Dietz's psychological thriller, "How a Boy Falls", premiered at Northlight Theatre, Chicago, in early 2020. It received a Joseph Jefferson Award nomination for Best New Work.

Productions of two new adaptations are scheduled for the 2022-2023 season:  "Gaslight" (the first authorized stage adaptation of the Patrick Hamilton thriller, "Gas Light") and "Murder on the Links" (from the novel by Agatha Christie).

Dietz's widely produced play, "Shooting Star", has been adapted by Dietz, Kirk Lynn, and Meg Ryan for the upcoming film, "What Happens Later", to be directed by Ryan.  The movie is scheduled to star Ryan and David Duchovny.

Dietz's overview of the current new play field, and his long-standing place in it, was recently published as an article entitled "Why New Plays Now? A Case for Supporting the Unimaginable", American Theatre Magazine, December, 2022. 

Recent plays include the dark, two-character mystery "Mirror Lake"; a ghost-like valentine to working in the theatre, "Haunted Play [A Tale of the Naive and Macabre]"; and the "micro intimacy" thriller, "The Shimmering".

During the 2018–19 season, Dietz premiered two interlocking plays for adult and youth audiences, entitled "The Great Beyond" and "The Ghost of Splinter Cove."

During the 2015–16 season, Dietz premiered three new plays:  "Bloomsday" (American Theatre Critics Association Steinberg New Play Award Citation), "This Random World" (Humana Festival of New American Plays), and the thriller "On Clover Road" (National New Play Network rolling world premiere).

Dietz's plays have been seen at Steppenwolf Theatre (Chicago IL), Old Globe Theatre (San Diego CA), Actor's Theatre of Louisville (KY), Seattle Repertory Theatre (WA), Berkeley Repertory Theatre (CA), Oregon Shakespeare Festival (Ashland), McCarter Theatre Center (Princeton, NJ), Alliance Theatre (Atlanta GA), Trinity Repertory Company (RI), the Dallas Theater Center (TX), and the Denver Center Theatre Company, among others.  In 2010, Dietz was named one of the most produced playwrights in America (excluding Shakespeare), placing eighth on the list, tied with Tennessee Williams and Edward Albee for number of productions.  Dietz's plays have been produced internationally in over twenty countries, and translated into a dozen languages.

Dietz's work as a director has been seen Off-Broadway (Westside Arts), at major regional theaters (Actor's Theatre of Louisville, Seattle Repertory Theatre, ACT Theatre - Seattle, Northlight Theater - Chicago, Denver Center Theatre Company, Los Angeles Theatre Center, Merrimack Repertory Theatre - Lowell MA, City Theatre - Pittsburgh), as well as at the Sundance Institute and the Playwrights' Center - Minneapolis.

Dietz taught in the MFA Playwriting and Directing programs at the University of Texas at Austin from 2006-2018,.  At UT/Austin, Dietz created an annual new play showcase (UTNT - UT New Theatre), as well as a newly re-imagined MFA Directing program.  Notable former students include playwrights George Brant, Frances Ya-Chu Cowhig, Jenny Connell Davis, Martin Zimmerman, Kimber Lee, Meghan Kennedy, Andrew Hinderaker, Abe Koogler, Diana Grisanti, Gabriel Jason Dean, Sarah Saltwick;  and directors Halena Kays, Luke Leonard, Courtney Sale, Will Davis, and Hannah Wolf.  Dietz continues to conduct master classes in playwriting, story-making and collaboration around the United States.  He also teaches nationally as a Dramatists' Guild "Traveling Master."

Life and career
Born and raised in Denver, Colorado, Dietz graduated in 1980 with a B.A. in Theatre Arts from the University of Northern Colorado, after which he moved to Minneapolis and began his career as a director of new plays at The Playwrights' Center and other local theaters.  During these years he also formed a small theatre company (Quicksilver Stage) and began to write plays of his own.  A commission from ACT Theatre to write "God's Country" brought him to Seattle, Washington in 1988, and he lived and worked in Seattle from 1991 to 2006.  In 2006 he accepted a professorship at the University of Texas at Austin.  Since 2006, he and his family have divided their time between Austin and Seattle.

He is the recipient of the PEN U.S.A. Award in Drama (for Lonely Planet, perhaps his most widely performed work); the Kennedy Center Fund for New American Plays Award (Fiction and Still Life With Iris); the Lila Wallace/Reader's Digest Award (The Rememberer); the Yomiuri Shimbun Award for his adaptation of Shusaku Endo's Silence; and the 2007 Edgar Allan Poe Award for Best Mystery for his adaptation of William Gillette's and Arthur Conan Doyle's 1899 play Sherlock Holmes: The Final Adventure.   Dietz is also a two-time finalist for the prestigious Steinberg New Play Award (for "Last of the Boys" and "Becky's New Car"), given by the American Theatre Critics Association.  He was awarded the 2016 Steinberg New Play Award Citation for "Bloomsday."

Dietz's plays range from the political ("Last of the Boys", "God's Country", "Halcyon Days", "Lonely Planet") to the comedic ("Becky's New Car", "More Fun than Bowling", "Over the Moon"). Many of them, (e.g. "Trust", "Private Eyes", "Fiction", "Rancho Mirage") have as a central theme the effects of personal betrayal and deception.  A recent obsession of Dietz's seems to be the return of the "thriller" to the contemporary theatre canon. Examples include the conspiracy thriller, "Yankee Tavern";  the classic single-set thriller, "On Clover Road";  the intimate thriller, "The Shimmering";   and the psychological thriller, "How a Boy Falls."  The majority of the plays are published (in acting editions) by either Dramatists Play Service (New York), or Samuel French, Inc., (New York).  An anthology of Dietz's work for young audiences was published by UT Press in 2015.  Many of the short plays are also anthologized.

Dietz's work as a director has been seen at many of America's leading regional theatres. He has directed premiere productions of new plays at Actors Theatre of Louisville's Humana Festival, Seattle Repertory Theatre, Denver Center Theatre Company, Northlight Theatre (Chicago), ACT Theatre (Seattle), San Jose Repertory Theatre, City Theatre (Pittsburgh), Westside Arts (Off-Broadway), and the Sundance Institute, among many others. He was a resident director for ten years at the Playwrights' Center in Minneapolis, where he also served as Artistic Director of Midwest PlayLabs.

Dietz's articles on new play development—most first seen in American Theatre Magazine—have been widely discussed and re-printed.

Works

Original plays (by year of first production)
Brothers and Sisters (1981)
Railroad Tales (1983)
Random Acts (1983)
Wanderlust (1984)
More Fun Than Bowling (1986)
Painting It Red (1986) (music by Gary Rue and Leslie Ball)
Burning Desire (1987) (short play)
Foolin' Around with Infinity (1987)
Ten November (1987) (music by Eric Bain Peltoniemi)
God's Country (1988) (Revised: 2021)
Happenstance (1989)  (music by Eric Bain Peltoniemi)
After You (1990) (short play)
Halcyon Days (1991)
To The Nines (1991) (short play)
Trust (1992)
Lonely Planet (1993)
Handing Down the Names (1994)
The Nina Variations (1996) (variations on the last scene of  Chekhov's The Seagull)
Private Eyes (1996)
Still Life with Iris (1997)
Rocket Man (1998)
Fiction (2002)
Left to Right (2002) (short)
Inventing van Gogh (2004)
Last of the Boys (2004)
The Spot (2004) (short)
September Call-Up (2006) (short)
Yankee Tavern (2007)
Shooting Star (2008)
Becky's New Car (2008)
Rancho Mirage (2012)
Mad Beat Hip & Gone (2013) 
On Clover Road (2015)
Bloomsday (2015)
This Random World (2016)
Drive All Night (2018) (short) 
The Great Beyond (2019) 
The Ghost of Splinter Cove (2019) 
How a Boy Falls (2020)

Plays adapted from other sources
The Rememberer (1994) (from the unpublished memoirs of Joyce Simmons Cheeka)
Silence (1995) (from Shusaku Endo's novel)
Dracula (1996) (from Bram Stoker)
Force of Nature (1999) (after Elective Affinities by Goethe)
Go, Dog. Go! (2003) (from P.D. Eastman) – a musical adaptation co-written with his wife, Allison Gregory.
Over The Moon (2003) (after "The Small Bachelor" by P.G. Wodehouse)
Paragon Springs (2004) (from "An Enemy of the People" by Ibsen)
Honus & Me (2005) (from Dan Gutman)
Sherlock Holmes: The Final Adventure (2006) (from William Gillette and Arthur Conan Doyle)
Jackie & Me (2013) (from Dan Gutman)
American la Ronde (2017) (from Arthur Schnitzler's 1900 play, Reigen or La Ronde)
Dracula: Mina's Quest (2019) (from Bram Stoker)

References

External links
 University of Texas at Austin page on Steven Dietz
 University of Texas Press, 'Steven Dietz: Four Plays for Family Audiences'
 "Renowned playwright Steven Dietz's influence is heavy in D-FW scene" - Dallas Morning News
 "Being Prolific Has Its Own Rewards" - Austin American Statesman profile
 "Working Playwright" - Austin Chronicle article by Robert Faires
 "Brick Solid" - Seattle Weekly article by John Longenbaugh
 Faculty page at University of Texas
 March 2003 Interview with Steven Dietz from Theatrescene.net
 Playbill's Brief Encounter with Steven Dietz
 Information on Steven Dietz by doollee.com
 Bibliography at goodreads.com
 Director and Playwright Discuss Last of the Boys, Steppenwolf Theatre Company
 Michael D. Mitchell Bio and discussion of Sherlock Holmes adaptation in "Understudy", a guide to plays at Fulton, 2007.

1958 births
Living people
20th-century American dramatists and playwrights
Writers from Denver
Edgar Award winners
University of Northern Colorado alumni
University of Texas at Austin faculty
21st-century American dramatists and playwrights
American male dramatists and playwrights
20th-century American male writers
21st-century American male writers